Don Joint (born November 3, 1956) is an American artist and curator who lives and works in New York City. His work consists of collage, assemblage, painting, works on paper, and photography.

Joint studied at the Maryland Institute College of Art and the Chautauqua Institution.

Artist

Exhibition
Joint's work has been shown internationally in solo exhibitions at Pavel Zoubok Gallery, NY; Washington County Museum of Fine Arts, Hagerstown, MD; [FRED [London], England; Galerie Marion Meyer, Paris, France; Price Street Gallery, New York, NY.

His work has been included extensively in two-person and group shows in galleries and museums across the United States and Europe, including the Dr. M.T. Geoffrey Art Gallery, St John's University, Queens, NY; Katonah Museum of Art, Katonah, NY; McClain Gallery, Houston, TX; The Daum Museum of Contemporary Art, Sedalia, MO; Samek Art Gallery, Bucknell University, Lewisburg, PA; The Islip Art Museum, East Islip, NY; Pavel Zoubok Gallery, New York, NY; FRED [London]; Zoller Gallery, Penn State University, State College, PA; and Francis M. Naumann Fine Art, New York, NY.

His work has been reviewed in The New York Times, Art in America, ARTnews and The New York Sun among others, and has been written about by Susanna Coffey, Grace Glueck, Mario Naves and Edward Leffingwell.

Don Joint is represented in New York by Francis M. Naumann Fine Art and his collage work is represented in New York by Pavel Zoubok Gallery.

Public Collections
Selected public collections with Joint's work include Baltimore Museum of Art,  Cleveland Museum of Art, David Owsley Museum of Art at Ball State University, Erie Art Museum, Joel and Lila Harnett Museum of Art at the University of Richmond, Mount Holyoke College, Oklahoma City Museum of Art, Syracuse University Art Museum, Swope Art Museum, and University of Iowa Museum of Art.

Residencies
Joint has held residencies at the Virginia Center for the Creative Arts and the Vermont Studio Center.

Book Covers
Joint created collages for the cover for every issue of the annual arts journal The Sienese Shredder (2006–2010) and the slipcase that housed the volumes, as well as the 10th Anniversary Edition of Virginia Woolf's On Being Ill, published by Paris Press in 2012.

Curator
As curator of the Shredder space, Joint was a pivotal to the partnership that formed New York's Schroeder Romero & Shredder gallery. Interviewed by Art in America Magazine, the gallery's director Mark Shortliffe encapsulated the program: "The gallery will always have a strong contemporary show but will hopefully stretch how we view new art by pairing it with older, influential works. We'll show two exhibitions simultaneously: one contemporary and one historical, encouraging a dialogue between the two."

In The New York Times review of Schroeder Romero's VIVD and Shredder's PAVERS, Roberta Smith said, "The shows' invigorating call and response bodes well for future interactions between these side-by-side entities."

As an independent curator, Joint also organized Manufactured Unreality: The Art of Collage at Francis M. Naumann Fine Art

References

Bibliography
R. C. Baker, "Uptown and in Chelsea, Two Shows Exemplify the New Surreal," The Village Voice, May 14, 2014
Erik La Prade, "Don Joint: Coney Island Blueprints,"catalogue essay, Pavel Zoubok Gallery, New York
Susana Coffey, "Fishing For Knick Knacks: Collages by Don Joint," catalog essay, Pavel Zoubok Gallery, New York, NY
John Goodrich, "Cut-and-paste, Then and Now," The New York Sun, July 3, 2008
Alexandra Anderson-Spivy, "Everything Plus the Kitchen Sink," Artnet Magazine, July 28, 2008
Mario Naves, "Oil on an Unusual Surface: A Painting Finds His Marbles," Currently Hanging: The New York Observer, January 23, 2005, p 16.
Edward Leffingwell, Brice Brown and Don Joint at Francis M. Nauman,." Art in America, January 2005, p 130
Grace Gleuck, Art in Review: Brice Brown and Don Joint: A Marriage in Paint," The New York Times, April 23, 2004
Peter Frank, Brice Brown and Don Joint: A Marriage in Paint," May–June 2004

External links
 Don Joint artist page on Francis M. Nauman Fine Art
 

 https://www.wkok.com/580702-2/

American contemporary painters
1956 births
Living people
20th-century American painters
American male painters
21st-century American painters
Maryland Institute College of Art alumni
American art curators
Artists from Erie, Pennsylvania
20th-century American male artists

https://www.post-gazette.com/life/seen/2022/09/26/seen-haven-house-don-joint/stories/202209260005